Tadadi (Tadari) is one of the ports in Uttara Kannada, Karnataka, India. It is near Gokarna in Kumta taluk.

It is known for its agriculture & Fishing and has produced many engineers, scientists, doctors, educationists who have made significant contributions to the country's economy and growth.

Tadadi name is derived from Sanskrit word ताड़ {taDa} = PALM (Noun), Land of palm trees

Tadadi is a coastal site in Karnataka that overlooks the picturesque Western Ghats. The only free-flowing river of the Western Ghats, Aghanashini, empties itself into the Arabian Sea here, creating an incredible 1800 hectares of estuary in the process. Over 26 mangrove species offer perfect habitat for some 100 species of fish and other aquatic life. Trade in mollusks is done here. Salt production is an ancillary economic activity on which 800 families directly depend.

The Tadadi village has a fishing harbour and a fish processing plant which was set up by a team of experts from Denmark. Many fishing communities thrive on the marine life that abounds in the region. While the men bring home the catch, the women slice the fish and marinate it with salt. The hills, the river, the colourful boats and the fish processing activities make a visit to Tadadi interesting if you can tolerate the strong odour.

Off late due to commercialization of the area, beaches are polluted. Local activists are running campaign to clean the beaches (#tadadichalo). The Tadadi Sayeds group have come forward to clean the area. Vaseem Sayed group president, Afzal Syed group chairman.

Tadadi is famous for fishes like shetli (prawns), bangade, taarlee, belanji, ravas, khubbe, tesriya, iswana, samdali, and paplet.

Demographics of Tadadi

Tadadi is a small village/hamlet in Kumta Taluk in Uttara Kannada District of Karnataka, India. It comes under Gokarna Panchayath. It is located 62 km south from the district headquarters of Karwar, 233 km from the chief port city of Mangalore, and 444 km from the state capital of Bangalore.

Tadadi is surrounded by Honnavara Taluk towards the south, Ankola Taluk towards the north, Sirsi Taluk towards the east, and Bhatkala Taluk towards the south.

Kumta, Ankola, Sirsi, and Karwar are the cities nearby Tadadi.

How to reach Tadadi: By Rail 
Kumta Railway Station are the very nearby railway stations to Tadadi (Even at Madanageri which is around 10 km. from Tadadi, Some trains will hault). Harwada Rail Way Station (near to Ankola), Ankola Rail Way Station (near to Ankola), Kumta Rail Way Station (near to Kumta) are the Rail way stations reachable from near by towns. However Madgaon Rail Way Station is major railway station 117 km near to Tadadi 
By Road 
Kumta, Ankola are the nearby by towns to Tadadi having road connectivity to Tadadi 
Nearby cities: Hanehalli-Bankikodla twin villages of North Kanara (ಹನೇಹಳಎಂಬ ಜಗತ್ತು), Kumta ಕುಮಟಾ, Honnavar

There are no colleges in the village. However, there is a Government Kannada Primary School. Students travel to the nearby towns for high school and college. Nearby cities for high school include Gokarna and nearby colleges are either in Ankola or Kumta cities.

Coordinates:    14°32'3"N     74°22'36"E

Tadadi Port

Tadadi is a minor fishing port located at the mouth of Aghanashini River, Uttara Kannada District, in the Indian state of Karnataka. The port has an effective vast waterfront area, where minerals, forests, agricultural and marine wealth are in abundance.

The proposed power projects at Tadari are being opposed on environmental grounds by farmers and fishermen, who believe that they would lead to pollution of river Aghanashini. Fishermen feel that these projects would lead to reduction in fish catch. Sea erosion is a problem in the coastal belt.

The port lies at the mouth of Aghanashini, about 54 km north of Honnavar. Tons of silica sand was exported through this port. It is one of the proposed ports to be developed into mega ports, under the Sagarmala project of the Government of India.

Language and religion

The main languages spoken in this district are Kannada, Konkani, Urdu, and Marathi. Kannada is the predominant language of the district, followed by Konkani, which is also widely spoken. Urdu, Hindi, and English are also used in social communication.

A famous dargah is situated near the banks of Tadadi. Tomb believed to be built in the 17th century of the saint from the clans of Peer Shan Shamsuddin Kharobat, whose tomb is situated in Sadashivgad, Karwar, Uttara Kannada. This is a place of harmonious existence of two different cultures and religions; a Muslim graveyard and a mosque are situated next to the dargah.

The Ambijalinga Temple is also located in Tadadi, built by local fishermen.

Cuisine

Tadadi is known for seafood such as jhinga (prawns/shrimp), bangade (mackerel), shevtta, taarlee (sardines), belunje, ravas, khubbe (mussels), tesriya (clams), sharmaie, and sondale. 

Uttara Kannada is famous for a variety of seafood delicacies. Fish curry and rice is the staple diet of locals, as well as cashews and coconut. The staple diet includes a portion of steamed rice and a vegetable or seafood accompaniment/dried fish. Seafood is immensely popular due to its ease of availability and is prepared with a lot of local spices.

Naal kharachna (Coconut scraping) is a must activity before cooking, as coconut and coconut milk are a compulsory ingredient of the local cuisine; coconut is used extensively in all foods. Sukki Macchi is a famous side dish eaten during every meal.

References

http://www.dc-epaper.com/dc/dcb/2008/08/25/ArticleHtmls/25_08_2008_002_006.shtml
http://www.sahilonline.org/english/news.php?catID=coastalnews&nid=450
http://www.indiatogether.org/2006/jun/hrt-tadadi.htm#sthash.awC98wwQ.dpuf
http://www.indiatogether.org/2006/jun/hrt-tadadi.htm

Villages in Uttara Kannada district